Utrecht Overvecht is a railway station located in Overvecht, Utrecht, Netherlands. The station opened in 1968 and is on the Utrecht–Kampen railway. The station has had 3 platforms since 1992.  It also has a kids' slide to the outside street for use by the busy passengers.

Train services
The following services call at Utrecht Overvecht:
2x per hour local service (Sprinter) from Utrecht to Baarn
2x per hour local service (Sprinter) from Utrecht to Amersfoort, and Zwolle
2x per hour local service (Sprinter) from Utrecht to Hilversum, and Almere
2x per hour local service (Sprinter) from The Hague to Leiden, Hoofddorp, Schiphol Airport, Duivendrecht, Hilversum, and Utrecht

Bus Services

 1 from Overvecht Hospital to Utrecht Overvecht, Utrecht Centraal, and Utrecht Lunetten
 8 from Utrecht Overvecht to Overvecht Zuid, Utrecht Centraal, and Utrecht Lunetten
 10 from Utrecht Lunetten to Transwijk, Oog in Al, Zuilen, Utrecht Overvecht, Rijnsweerd, De Uithof University, and UMC Hospital
 30 from Overvecht Hospital to Utrecht Overvecht, De Uithof University, UMC Hospital, and WKZ Children's Hospital
 122 from Utrecht Overvecht to Westbroek, Oud-Maarsseveen, Breukelveen, and Loosdrecht

References
NS website
U-OV website
Dutch public transport planner

Railway stations opened in 1968
Overvecht
Railway stations on the Centraalspoorweg